Willards may refer to:

In organizations
 Members of the Lincoln-Lee Legion, an early 20th-century temperance group

In places
 Willards, Maryland, a town in the United States
Willards, a former Los Angeles chicken restaurant that Cecil B. DeMille and partners bought in 1940 and converted to the Los Feliz Brown Derby

See also
Willard (disambiguation)